Lake Charlotte, a round lake with a small cove on its northwest side, has a surface area of . Lake Charlotte is south of Sebring, Florida, and Sparta Road goes around the lake's northeast to southeast side. On the north and east shores are a scattering of residences. The rest of the lake is surrounded by woods and grassland, much of which is planned for residential development. The city limits of Sebringbordere two-thirds of this lake.

Lake Charlotte has no public access on its shores. However, the Take Me Fishing website says the lake contains  largemouth bass and bluegill.

References

Sebring, Florida
Charlotte
Charlotte